In atmospheric science, equivalent temperature is the temperature of air in a parcel from which all the water vapor has been extracted by an adiabatic process. 

Air contains water vapor that has been evaporated into it from liquid sources (lakes, sea, etc...). The energy needed to do that has been taken from the air. This will depend on the latent heat release as: 

where:
  : latent heat of evaporation (2400 kJ/kg at 25°C to 2600 kJ/kg at −40°C)
  : specific heat at constant pressure for air (≈ 1004 J/(kg·K)) 

Tables exist for exact values of the last two coefficients.

See also 
 Wet-bulb temperature
 Potential temperature
 Atmospheric thermodynamics
 Equivalent potential temperature

Bibliography
 M Robitzsch, Aequivalenttemperatur und Aequivalentthemometer, Meteorologische Zeitschrift, 1928, pp. 313-315.
 M K Yau and R.R. Rogers, Short Course in Cloud Physics, Third Edition, published by Butterworth-Heinemann, January 1, 1989, 304 pages.  
 J.V. Iribarne and W.L. Godson, Atmospheric Thermodynamics, published by D. Reidel Publishing Company, Dordrecht, Holland, 1973, 222 pages

Atmospheric thermodynamics
Atmospheric temperature